Edward A. Jontos (June 14, 1910 – November 26, 1996) was an American football, basketball, and lacrosse player and coach. He was a three-sport athlete at Syracuse University in the early 1930s. and was selected by the New York Giants in the 1936 NFL Draft. Jontos served as the head football coach at Rensselaer Polytechnic Institute (RPI) in Troy, New York from 1946 to 1952, compiling a record of 19–35–2.

References

1910 births
1996 deaths
American football guards
Forwards (basketball)
RPI Engineers football coaches
RPI Engineers men's lacrosse coaches
St. Bonaventure Brown Indians football coaches
St. Bonaventure Bonnies men's basketball coaches
Syracuse Orange football players
Syracuse Orange football coaches
Syracuse Orange men's basketball players
Syracuse Orange men's lacrosse coaches
Syracuse Orange men's lacrosse players
College golf coaches in the United States
Sportspeople from Bridgeport, Connecticut
Players of American football from Connecticut
Basketball players from Connecticut
Lacrosse players from Connecticut